Rajab Abdul Kahali (born 15 March 1990), also known by his stage name Harmonize, is a Tanzanian Bongo Flava artist and music entrepreneur born in Mtwara Region.

Since 2009 after completing his secondary school education, Harmonize is living in Dar es Salaam. Sometimes, he is referred to as Konde Boy referring to his Makonde heritage. Other names he goes by include Jeshi, Tembo, Mbunge, Konde-Mabeyo and Bakhresa. "Aiyola" is his debut song which introduced him to Tanzanian music industry in 2015. He is well known for his songs "Kwa Ngwaru", featuring Diamond Platnumz, and "Show Me" featuring Rich Mavoko. In 2017, MTV Base (African TV channel) included him in their African edition of "Ones to Watch for 2017". He was the first artist to sign a recording contract with Diamond Platnumz WCB Wasafi label and has since founded his own record label company, Konde Music Worldwide.

Career 
He started his music career in 2011. In 2015, he met Diamond Platnumz and got signed at WCB Wasafi in 2015. His first song "Aiyola" was commercially successful. He won three awards from WatsUp TV, AFRIMMA and AEA USA (in the US).

On 25 February 2019, he released 'Afro Bongo'. His first EP featuring Diamond Platnumz, Burna Boy, Mr. Eazi and Yemi Alade. Afro Bongo has four tracks including his major hit "Kainama" which is a track number one from the EP. "Kainama's" music video surfaced over 14 million views in twelve months.

Harmonize left WCB Wasafi at the end of 2019 and released several projects including 'The Return Of Q Chillah'. Out Of WCB, Harmonize released four commercial singles including 'Hainistui' and 'Uno'produced by east African hit makers Hunter Nation and Bonga  which is featured on his debut studio album 'Afro East' released on 14 March 2020.

Harmonize dropped his latest offering, an 18-track album titled Afro East, which is the follow-up to his 2019's EP Afro Bongo. Harmonize released the album with a hit single "Bedroom" produced by Hunter Nation Both the original single and the remix went on to amass over 8 million views on YouTube cementing Harmonize's longevity as a serious competitor in East Africa.

The album, which is the Tanzanian artist's debut Studio Album and first project since leaving Diamond Platnumz's record label, features Burna Boy, Lady Jay Dee, Phyno, Yemi Alade, Mr Eazi, Falz, Skales, Khaligraph Jones, Morgan Heritage, Dj Seven, Mr Blue, Prince Fahim and several others.

Afro East is another of Harmonize's projects that showcases his ability to seamlessly fuse Afropop with Singeli and Bongo.

On 5 November 2021, Harmonize released his sophomore album titled High School. The track list was revealed on the artist's Instagram page while he was on his 2021 American tour. The album was his first LP since Afro East. The project was preceded by the previously released Amapiano hits "Sandakalawe and "Teacher". Also, the first song on the album titled "Sorry" was partly performed on a week virtual concert by the artist held earlier prior to the album's release.

The album had twenty songs and only the two had been heard before ( "Sandakalawe" and "Teacher"). The album featured several prominent African acts including Naira Marley, Sarkodie, Bosiswa as well as labelmates Ibraah and Anjella. Also, featured was the  Tanzanian Singeli singer Sholo Mwamba. It marked a departure from the feature heavy Afro East as it had less features with most songs helmed by Harmonize alone.

In October 28 2022 Harmonize released his third studio album titled Made For Us. The 14 track album saw the award winning singer working with different heavyweights such as Jamaica's Spice South Africa's Ntoshi Gazi, Tanzania's Abigail Chams and Rwanda's Bruce Melody.  Few days before the album dropped, Harmonize announce on his Instagram that he won't take any measures to promote the highly anticipated album 

The album was critically acclaimed by music critics where as Music In Africa's Charles Maganga dubbed the album as the most personal album by Harmonize to date

Discography

"Paranawe" Ft. Rayvanny (2018)

"Show Me What You Got" Ft Yemi Alade (2018)

"Kushoto Kulia" (2019)

"Anajikosha" (2021)

EP

Afro Bongo

Studio Albums

• Afro East (2020) 

• High School (2021)

Awards and nominations 

|-
|rowspan="3"|2016
|Bado ft. Diamond Platnumz
|WatsUp TV Africa Music Video Awards for Best African Newcomer Video
|
|-
|rowspan="2"|Himself
|African Muzik Magazine Awards (AFRIMMA) for Best Newcomer
|
|-
|African Entertainment Awards (AEAUSA) for Best New Artist
|

References

External links

 
 
 

Living people
Tanzanian musicians
People from Mtwara Region
Tanzanian Muslims
1991 births
Swahili-language singers
21st-century Tanzanian male singers
Tanzanian hip hop musicians
Tanzanian Bongo Flava musicians